Melo umbilicatus, common name the heavy baler or umbilicate melon,  is a very large sea snail, a marine gastropod mollusc in the family Volutidae, the volutes.

References

 

Volutidae
Gastropods described in 1826